Blahovishchenske Raion, formerly Ulianovka Raion was a raion (district) of Kirovohrad Oblast in central Ukraine. The administrative center of the raion was the city of Blahovishchenske. The raion was abolished on 18 July 2020 as part of the administrative reform of Ukraine, which reduced the number of raions of Kirovohrad Oblast to four. The area of Blahovishchenske Raion was merged into Holovanivsk Raion.

At the time of disestablishment, the raion consisted of one hromada, Blahovishchenske urban hromada with the administration in Blahovishchenske.

References

Former raions of Kirovohrad Oblast
1923 establishments in the Soviet Union
Ukrainian raions abolished during the 2020 administrative reform